Sir Charles Fitzroy Maclean, 9th Baronet of Morvern (14 October 1798 – 27 January 1883) was the 25th Clan Chief of Clan Maclean from 1847 to 1883. He was a Colonel of the 81st regiment from 1831 to 1839, afterwards he was the Military Secretary at Gibraltar.

Biography
He was born on 14 October 1798 to Sir Fitzroy Jeffreys Grafton Maclean, 8th Baronet. He was educated at Eton College and the Royal Military College, Sandhurst. In 1816, he entered the Scots Guards, and afterward commanded the 81st Regiment. He was military secretary at Gibraltar. In 1846, he retired from the army as a Colonel of the 13th Light Dragoons. He opposed the attempt to abolish kilts in the army.

On 10 May 1831, he married Emily Eleanor Marsham, fourth daughter of the Honorable and Reverend Jacob Marsham. They had as their children:
Sir Fitzroy Donald Maclean, 10th Baronet, his heir and successor
Emily Frances Harriet Maclean
Louisa Marianne Maclean who married 12 July 1860, to Honorable Ralph Pelham Nevill, second son of the William Nevill, 4th Earl of Abergavenny
Fanny Henrietta Maclean, married 2 October 1855, to Admiral Sir Arthur Hood, 1st Baron Hood of Avalon
Georgiana Marcia Maclean, married 20 October 1868, to John Rolls, 1st Baron Llangattock of The Hendre

He died on 27 January 1883 or 27 December 1883 at West Cliffe House in Folkestone in Kent, England.

References

1798 births
1883 deaths
People educated at Eton College
Charles Fitzroy
Baronets in the Baronetage of Nova Scotia
Graduates of the Royal Military College, Sandhurst
Maclean, Charles, 5th Lord
19th-century British businesspeople